Claudio Kevo Cavallini (born 24 November 1952 in Florence – 20 October 2015) was an Italian sculptor. His nickname was "Kevo" with which he signed his works. At the age of 50, Claudio discovered that he could make sculptural forms from wood.

In 2012, he displayed his solo exhibition titled "A modern fairytale" in Pontassieve. His most recognized work, "Christ with arms raised", is on display permanently at the sanctuary of the Madonna del Sasso in territory of Pontassieve in Florence. In 2015 his work "Migranti", was exhibited in Pontassieve in the Sala dell'Eroine.

Art exhibitions
 Exhibition "Gattart", Firenze, Museo Bellini, 2008
 Prize "Artisti allo sbaraglio", Bagni di Lucca, Regio Casinò, first place, 2008
 Exhibition "L'arte nella natura", Campi Bisenzio, Hotel West Florence, 2008
 Exhibition "Tracce d'autore", Zola Predosa, Admiral Park Hotel, 2008
 Exhibition "Gattart Fiora Leone", Firenze, Palagio di Parte Guelfa, 2009
 Prize "Città di Montecatini", Montecatini Terme, Comune, quarto premio, 2009
 Exhibition "Mostra d'arte contemporanea", Rimini, Galleria d'arte Malatestiana2009
 Exhibition "Arte contemporanea italiana", Firenze, Galleria La Pergola Arte, 2009
 Exhibition  "La Pergola Arte a Palazzo", Firenze, Palazzo Medici Riccardi, 2009
 Exhibition  "Arcadia mostra d'arte contemporanea", Pitigliano, Granai Fortezza Orsini, 2009
 Solo Exhibition "Kevo espone", Montecatini Terme, Casa del Pittore dello Scultore e del poeta, 2009
 Exhibition "Contemporanea Arte in Movimento", Firenze, Galleria La Pergola Arte, 2009
 Exhibition "100 artisti per 100 botteghe", Firenze, via Gioberti, 2009
 Prize "XXVII Premio Firenze", Firenze, 2009
 "Artexpò", Pitigliano, Granai Fortezza Orsini, 2009
 Exhibition "100% Nero Fondente", Impruneta, Galleria IAC, 2010
 Exhibition "Pisartexpò", Pisa, Stazione Leopolda, 2010
 Prize "XXV Premio Italia per le arti visive", Capraia Fiorentina, ex Fornace Pasquinucci, 2010
 Prize "Piccolo Formato" La Pergola Arte, Firenze, Auditorium Cassa di Risparmio, secondo premio, 2010
 Exhibition "Dedicated to... Paolo Baracchi", Firenze, Galleria Gadarte, 2010
 Exhibition "Passeggiando nell'arte", Sorano, Fortezza Orsini, 2010
 Exhibition "Tutti assieme cromaticamente", Empoli, Palazzo Ghibellino, 2010
 Exhibition "III Mostra arte contemporanea", Pitigliano, Granai Fortezza Orsini, 2010
 "Arte in Fiera", Longarone, con la Galleria del Candelaio, 2010
 Exhibition "100 Artisti per 100 botteghe", Firenze, via Gioberti, 2010
 Exhibition "Viaggio nel contemporaneo", Firenze, Albergaccio del Machiavelli, 2010
 Prize "XXVIII Premio Firenze", Firenze, finalista, 2010
 "Artexpò 2010", Pitigliano, Granai Fortezza Orsini, 2010
 Exhibition "Gattart Fiora Leone", Firenze, Antichità dei Fossi, 2011
 Exhibition "Passeggiando nell'arte", Sorano, Sale del Mastio, Fortezza Orsini, 2011
 Exhibition "Arte in Rugapiana – I fantastici 4", Cortona, Palazzo Ferretti, 2011
 Solo Exhibition Festa dei Democratici, Molin del Piano, Circolo La Torretta, 2011
 "Immagina – Arte in Fiera", Reggio Emilia, Salone Fiere, 2011
 Exhibition "Viaggio nel contemporaneo", Piancastagnaio, Hotel Miramonti, 2011
 Exhibition "Tanto di cappello signor Vasari", Arezzo, Galleria Villicana D'Annibale, 2011
 Prize "XXIX Premio Firenze", Firenze, finalista, 2011
 Solo Exhibition "Una favola moderna", Pontassieve, Sala Eroine, Palazzo Comunale, 2012
 Solo Exhibition "Tra forma e sintesi", Vicchio del Mugello, Museo Casa di Giotto, 2012
 Exhibition "Arte in Rugapiana – Il ritorno dei fantastici 4", Cortona, Palazzo Ferretti, 2012
 Exhibition"Artisti in Cantina", Cerreto Guidi, Cantine di Portacaracosta, 2012
 Solo Exhibition "Espone Kevo", Campi Bisenzio, Cappella Villa Rucellai, 2012
 Solo Exhibition "All'ombra degli etruschi", Dicomano, Museo Etrusco, Palazzo Comunale, 2012
 Exhibition "Viaggio nel contemporaneo", Piancastagnaio, Hotel Miramonti, 2012
 Exhibition "Celebrazioni Vespucciane", Pontassieve, Sala delle Eroine, Palazzo Comunale, 2012
 Prize "XXX Premio Firenze", Firenze, Palazzo Vecchio, secondo premio "Fiorino d'argento", 2012
 Exhibition "Artistar Project", Milano, Galleria Artistar, 2012
 Exhibition "Volterra in cornice", Volterra, Palazzo dei Priori, 2013
 Exhibition "Arte da Firenze", Bratislava (Slovacchia), 2013
 Solo Exhibition "Naturalmente arte", Firenze, Museo di Storia Naturale La Specola, 2013
 Exhibition "Arte in Rugapiana – I fantastici 4", Cortona, Palazzo Ferretti, 2013
 Solo Exhibition "Legno e colore in Viterbo", Viterbo, Museo Colle del Duomo, 2013
 Exhibition "Operarte – Associazione in mostra", Firenze, Auditorium al Duomo, 2013
 "Premio della Fondazione Elisabetta e Mariachiara Casini Onlus", Firenze, Palazzo Vecchio, 2013
 Prize "XXXI Premio Firenze", Palazzo Vecchio, terzo premio "Medaglia di bronzo", 2013
 Solo Exhibition "I due volti dell'arte", Carpi, Palazzo dei Pio, 2014
 Prize "XXXII Premio Firenze", Palazzo Vecchio, terzo premio "Medaglia di bronzo", 2015
 Rassegna in occasione del Premio Letterario Internazionale "Tra le parole e l'infinito", Teatro Garibaldi, S. Maria Capua Vetere, 2015
 Solo Exhibition Galleria Comunale d'Arte Contemporanea, Palazzo Giorgi, Poppi, 2014
 Exhibition "V Esposizione Nazionale delle Arti Contemporanee", Soriano del Cimino, Castello Orsini, 2014
 Exhibition "Mostra degli artisti in permanenza", Soriano del Cimino, Factory Center, 2014
 Exhibition "Omaggio al ciclismo ricordando Gino Bartali", Firenze, Ciclomuseo Gino Bartali, 2014
 Exhibition "Arte da viaggio – 40 artisti con opere da mettere in valigia", Firenze, Simultanea Spazi d'Arte, 2014
 Exhibition "Itinere", collettiva itinerante, Bomarzo, Palazzo Orsini e Sant'Oreste, Palazzo Caccia Canali, 2014

References

External links
Orientepress
 Artistar Profile
 FirenzeToday Arte da viaggio

Sculptors from Florence
2015 deaths
1952 births